A Bowie knife is a pattern of fixed-blade fighting knife created by Rezin Bowie in the early 19th century for his brother Jim Bowie, who had become famous for his use of a large knife at a duel known as the Sandbar Fight.

Since the first incarnation, the Bowie knife has come to incorporate several recognizable and characteristic design features, although in common usage the term refers to any large sheath knife with a crossguard and a clip point. The knife pattern is still popular with collectors; in addition to various knife manufacturing companies there are hundreds of custom knife makers producing Bowie knives with different types of steel and variations in style.

Historical complications
The early history of the Bowie knife is complicated by murky definitions, limited supporting documentation, and conflicting claims. The Bowie knife is not well defined. By the mid-20th century most included some combination of blade length and blade shape. In the mid-19th century, when the popularity of the knife was at its peak, the term was applied to a wide range of blades.  Absent a consensus definition, it is impossible to clearly define the origin of the knife. To complicate matters, some American blades that meet the modern definition of the Bowie knife may pre-date Bowie.

The Bowie knife derives part of its name and reputation from James Bowie, a notorious knife fighter, who died at the Battle of the Alamo. James Bowie left a very thin paper trail; in the absence of verifiable facts, his history was buried in unverifiable knife-fighting legend. Historians seriously entertain the possibility that Bowie fought only one personal knife fight (and, if Rezin Bowie's account is true, that fight was not fought with a blade meeting the modern definition). That Sandbar Fight received national publicity (accounts in Philadelphia, New York, and the Niles' Register of Washington, D.C.) within months of the event. James Bowie prominently wore a large knife after the Sandbar fight.

The Bowie family provided a variety of conflicting knife histories. James Bowie left nothing. His brother Rezin Bowie provided a terse history two years after James' death. Sixteen years after James' death someone (assumed to be James' brother John) slightly amended Rezin's explanation to include a blacksmith. Rezin's grandchildren named a different blacksmith. A later Bowie claimed that the information attributed to John was a lie and that John probably never saw the document, etc.

In the mid-20th century, a Bowie knife book author took liberties with the historical facts. Some documents were misquoted, some reported facts cannot be confirmed, etc. Others incorporated the errors into their accounts of both Bowie and his knives.

With no solid definition and conflicting accounts of knife history, many were credited with the invention or improvement of the blade.

Origin and description

The historical Bowie knife was not a single design but was a series of knives improved several times by Jim Bowie over the years. The earliest such knife, made by Jesse Clift at Bowie's brother Rezin's request resembled Spanish hunting knives of the day, and differed little from a common butcher knife. It was straight-backed, described by witnesses as "a large butcher knife", and having no clip-point nor any handguard, with a simple riveted wood scale handle.

Bernard Levine has reported that the first known Bowie knife showed a strong Mediterranean influence insofar as general lines were concerned, particularly the shape of the traditional Spanish folding knife, then often carried by immigrants to Mexico and other territories of the Old Southwest.  In an 1828 account of the capture of a pirate schooner carrying a mixed group of Spanish and South American pirates, the carrying of knives similar to the early Bowie knife is mentioned:

After the Vidalia Sandbar fight, Bowie was a famous man, and the Bowie brothers received many requests for knives of the same design. Bowie and his brothers later commissioned more ornate custom blades from various knife makers including Daniel Searles and John Constable.   George William Featherstonhaugh described them as, "These formidable instruments ... are the pride of an Arkansas blood, and got their name of Bowie knives from a conspicuous person of this fiery climate."

According to an 1847 article, the Bowie knife was originally designed to fill the need for a wearable, convenient, close-combat weapon -  a short sword much shorter than the saber or other swords of the day, yet still possessing a heavy blade. This cleaver-like blade had enough weight to give the blade sufficient force in a slashing attack while permitting the use of cut-and-thrust sword fighting tactics.  By this time the 'Bowie knife' was already being made in a variety of sizes, with the optimum blade length similar to "that of a carving knife".  The blade design was described as:

The back of the blade sometimes had a strip of soft metal (normally brass or copper) inlaid which some believe was intended to catch an opponent's blade while others hold it was intended to provide support and absorb shock to help prevent breaking of poor quality steel or poorly heat-treated blades. (A brass back is an indication of modern construction.) Bowie knives often had an upper guard that bent forward at an angle (an S-guard) intended to catch an opponent's blade or provide protection to the owner's hand during parries and corps-a-corps.

Some Bowie knives had a notch on the bottom of the blade near the hilt known as a "Spanish Notch". The Spanish Notch is often cited as a mechanism for catching an opponent's blade; however, some Bowie researchers hold that the Spanish Notch is ill-suited to this function and frequently fails to achieve the desired results. These researchers, instead, hold that the Spanish Notch has the much more mundane function as a tool for stripping sinew and repairing rope and nets, as a guide to assist in sharpening the blade (assuring that the sharpening process starts at a specific point and not further up the edge), or as a point to relieve stress on the blade during use.

One characteristic of Bowie knives is the clip point at the top of the blade, which brings the tip of the blade lower than the spine and in line with the handle for better control during thrusting attacks. As the goal is to produce a sharp, stabbing point, most Bowie knives have a bevel ground along the clip, typically 1/4 of the way, but sometimes much further running the entire top-edge. This is referred to as a false edge as from a distance it looks sharpened, although it may or may not be. Regardless of whether or not the false edge is sharp, it serves to take metal away from the point, streamlining the tip and thus enhancing the penetration capability of the blade during a stab. The version attributed to blacksmith James Black had this false edge fully sharpened in order to allow someone trained in European techniques of saber fencing to execute the maneuver called the "back cut" or "back slash".  A brass quillon, usually cast in a mold, was attached to protect the hand.

The Bowie knife's design also lends itself to use as a hunting knife for skinning or butchering game. The curved top clip bevel of the blade, when suitably sharpened, may be used to remove the skin from a carcass, while the straight portion of the blade edge, toward the guard, can be used for cutting meat. Arkansas culturalist and researcher Russell T. Johnson describes the James Black knife in the following manner and at the same time captures the quintessence of the Bowie Knife: "It must be long enough to use as a sword, sharp enough to use as a razor, wide enough to use as a paddle, and heavy enough to use as a hatchet."  Most such knives intended for hunting are only sharpened on one edge, to reduce the danger of cutting oneself while butchering and skinning the carcass.

History

The Vidalia Sandbar Fight 

The first knife, with which Bowie became famous, allegedly was designed by Jim Bowie's brother Rezin in Avoyelles Parish, Louisiana and smithed by blacksmith Jesse Clifft out of an old file.  Period court documents indicate that Rezin Bowie and Clifft were well acquainted with one another. Rezin's granddaughter claimed in an 1885 letter to Louisiana State University that her mother (Rezin's daughter) personally witnessed Clifft make the knife for her father.

This knife became famous as the knife used by Bowie at the Sandbar Fight, a famous 1827 duel between Bowie and several men including a Major Norris Wright of Alexandria, Louisiana.  The fight took place on a sandbar in the Mississippi River across from Natchez, Mississippi, and is the only documented fight in which Bowie was known to have employed his Bowie knife design. In this battle, Bowie was stabbed, shot, and beaten half to death but managed to win the fight using the large knife.

Jim Bowie's older brother John later claimed that the knife at the Sandbar Fight was not Clifft's knife, but a knife specifically made for Bowie by a blacksmith named Snowden.

James Black's Bowie knife 
The most famous version of the Bowie knife was designed by Jim Bowie and presented to Arkansas blacksmith James Black in the form of a carved wooden model in December 1830. Black produced the knife ordered by Bowie, and at the same time created another based on Bowie's original design but with a sharpened edge on the curved top edge of the blade. Black offered Bowie his choice and Bowie chose the modified version. Knives such as this, with a blade shaped like that of the Bowie knife, but with a pronounced false edge, are today called "Sheffield Bowie" knives, because this blade shape became so popular that cutlery factories in Sheffield, England were mass-producing such knives for export to the U.S. by 1850, usually with a handle made from either hardwood, deer antler, or bone, and sometimes with a guard and other fittings of sterling silver. The spine of the knife was covered with soft brass or silver, reportedly to catch the opponent's blade in the course of a knife fight, while a brass quillion protected the hand from the blade.

In 1831 Bowie returned with his James Black Bowie knife to Texas, and was involved in a knife fight with three men armed with firearms, who had been hired to kill him by the man he had spared in his 1829 fight. According to reports of the time, Bowie used his knife to kill all three men: one assassin was nearly decapitated, the second was disemboweled, and the skull of the third man was split open. Bowie died at the Battle of the Alamo five years later and in death both he and his knife became an American legend. The fate of the original Bowie knife is unknown; however, a knife bearing the engraving "Bowie No. 1" has been acquired by the Historic Arkansas Museum from a Texas collector and has been attributed to Black through scientific analysis.

Black soon had a booming business making and selling these knives out of his shop in Washington, Arkansas. Black continued to refine his technique and improve the quality of the knife as he went. In 1839, shortly after his wife's death, Black was nearly blinded when, while he was in bed with illness, his father-in-law and former partner broke into his home and attacked him with a club, having objected to his daughter having married Black years earlier. Black was no longer able to continue in his trade.

Black's knives were known to be exceedingly tough, yet flexible, and his technique has not been duplicated. Black kept his technique secret and did all of his work behind a leather curtain. Many claim that Black rediscovered the secret of producing true Damascus steel.

In 1870, at the age of 70, Black attempted to pass on his secret to the son of the family that had cared for him in his old age, Daniel Webster Jones. However, Black had been retired for many years and found that he himself had forgotten the secret. Jones would later become Governor of Arkansas.

The claims regarding James Black and his knives have been challenged by historians and knife experts.  Little can be either proven or disproven; Black was found mentally incompetent before his claims were published.

The birthplace of the Bowie knife is now part of the Old Washington Historic State Park which has over 40 restored historical buildings and other facilities including Black's shop. The park is known as "The Colonial Williamsburg of Arkansas". The University of Arkansas Hope - Texarkana opened their James Black School of Bladesmithing and Historic Trades in historic Washington in January 2020.

Later history

The term "Bowie knife" appeared in advertising (multiple places) by 1835, about 8 years after the sandbar brawl, while James Bowie was still alive. From context, "Bowie knife" needed no description then, but the spelling was variable. Among the first mentions was a plan to combine a Bowie knife and pistol. Cutlers were shipping sheath knives from Sheffield England by the early 1830s. By 1838 a writer in a Baltimore newspaper (posted from New Orleans) suggested that every reader had seen a Bowie knife.

The Bowie knife found its greatest popularity in the Old Southwest of the mid-19th century. However, accounts of Bowie knife fighting schools are based on fiction; newspapers of the era in the region contained advertisements for classes in fencing and self-defense.

Bowie knives had a role in the American conflicts of the nineteenth century. They are historically mentioned in the independence of Texas, in the Mexican War, the California gold rush, the civil strife in Kansas, the Civil War and later conflicts with the American Indians.  John Brown (abolitionist) carried a Bowie (which was taken by J. E. B. Stuart). (p 117)  John Wilkes Booth (assassin of Abraham Lincoln) dropped a large Bowie knife as he escaped. (p 158)  "Buffalo Bill" Cody reportedly scalped a sub-chief in 1876 in revenge for Custer (the Battle of Warbonnet Creek). An illustration of the reputed event showed a Bowie knife. (p 171) Brigham Young, president of the Church of Jesus Christ of Latter-day Saints (LDS Church), used to carry a Bowie knife with him, and dreamed about killing ex-Mormon apostates with it; for this reason, it has a significance to the DezNat (alt-right LDS) community online, who link it to the concept of blood atonement in Mormonism.

With the advent of affordably priced, reliable black-powder revolvers in the US (including surplus ex-Civil war handguns), the popularity of the Bowie knife declined sharply after 1865.  While still quite popular, newer Bowie designs began to incorporate much shorter blades of seven or eight inches, a length more suited to butchering and skinning game animals.  By the turn of the century, the most mass-produced Bowies were being sold as all-purpose outdoor hunting/camping knives. Despite this, the Bowie still retained its ability to serve as a close-in fighting knife.  The USMC Ka-Bar of World War II fame is based on a Bowie design dating back to the classic Marbles Ideal camping/hunting knife first introduced in 1899. 

Since the 1960s, Bowie knives with sawteeth machined into the back side of the blade appeared inspired by the United States Air Force survival knife which is used by several branches of the US Armed Forces. Each knife is manufactured in accordance with US Government specifications. It features a 5" 1095 carbon steel clip point sawback blade with a swedge, false top edge and fullers. The handle is made from natural leather with a stainless steel butt cap. The included natural leather sheath comes with a whetstone and leg tie. The sawteeth were intended to cut through the plexiglass canopy of a downed aircraft. Shortly after similar knives with a metal hollow handle appeared allowing small survival items to be stored inside the handle.  Bowies are still popular to this day as evidenced by the plethora of factory-made and custom-made bowie-style knives available to sportsmen and collectors.

Variations, collecting and portrayal in popular culture 
Jim Bowie was posthumously inducted into the Blade magazine Cutlery Hall of Fame at the 1988 Blade Show in Atlanta, Georgia in recognition of the impact that his design made upon generations of knife makers and cutlery companies.

Custom knife maker Ernest Emerson originally used a Bowie knife in his logo and manufactures a folding Bowie known in his line-up as the CQC13.

A Bowie knife appears on the shoulder sleeve insignia of the 39th Infantry Brigade Combat Team, headquartered in Little Rock, Arkansas.

The Alfred Williams Bowie knife
From the mid-1800s to the early 1900s, the Alfred Williams EBRO Bowie knife became a big seller in the USA. The EBRO trademark was purchased by Adolph Kastor & Sons of New York from Joseph Wostenholm & Sons in Sheffield. Alfred Williams specialized in selling knives to the USA market, and as such, his knives destined for the US market bore the EBRO importer stamp on them along with Alfred Williams’ name. Original Alfred Williams Bowie knives now sell for substantial amounts in auction. One unique Alfred Williams Bowie knife with a carved handle that belonged to a Texan family sold for $60,000 in auction.

Variations
Among the many variations on Bowie knives (discussed or shown by Flayderman or Peterson) are Bowies with interchangeable blades, push daggers, double-ended Bowies, folding Bowies, Bowies with a cork screw or other accessories, Bowie bayonets, combination Bowie/pistols, a Bowie with a saw-toothed back and Confederate Bowies with D-guards. Some were works of fine art. A giant folding Bowie, almost  in length and weighing  was made for presentation to an American congressman who offered to engage in a knife duel (a dispute between Roger Atkinson Pryor and John F. Potter).

Over the years many knives have been called Bowie knives and the term has almost become a generic term for any large sheath knife. During the early days of the American Civil War, Confederate soldiers carried immense knives called D-Guard Bowie knives.  Many of these knives could have qualified as short swords and were often made from old saw or scythe blades.

The Bowie knife is sometimes confused with the "Arkansas toothpick", possibly due to the interchangeable use of the names "Arkansas toothpick", "Bowie knife", and "Arkansas knife" in the antebellum period. The Arkansas toothpick is essentially a heavy dagger with a straight  blade. While balanced and weighted for throwing, the toothpick can be used for thrusting and slashing. Although James Black is popularly credited with inventing the "Arkansas toothpick", no firm evidence exists for this claim.

Knives made in Sheffield, England, were quick to enter the market with "Bowie knives" of a distinctive pattern that most modern users identify with the true form Bowie. The Sheffield pattern blade is thinner than the Black/Musso knives, while the false edge is often longer, with a more oblique and less pronounced clip edge.  While the Bowie is often considered a uniquely American knife, most blades were produced in Sheffield England.  Sheffield Bowies were sold with a wide range of etched or stamped slogans designed to appeal to Americans: "Death to Abolition", "Death to Traitors", "Americans Never Surrender", "Alabama Hunting Knife", "Arkansas Toothpick", "Gold Seeker's Protection"... American victories and generals were commemorated.  "Bowie Knife" is etched on many different designs (including folding knives) of the era.  The British disguised the origin of their products, operating the "Washington", "Philadelphia", "Boston", "Manhattan", "America", and "Columbia Works" in Sheffield. They stamped "US", "NY", etc. on their blades. The Sheffield "factories" were warehouses that collected the work of area craftsmen. The smelters, forgers, grinders, silversmiths, carvers, etchers ... were individuals or small businesses.

Collecting
During the late 19th and 20th centuries, the Bowie knife served usefully as a camp and hunting tool, as well as a weapon, and is still popular with some hunters and trappers in the present day.  However, as today's campers and backpackers generally rely on prepared lightweight foods, and have little or no use for a large knife as a weapon or for butchering wild game animals, the traditional Bowie pattern knife is today mostly purchased by collectors or edged weapon enthusiasts.

The Bowie remains popular with collectors. In addition to various knife manufacturing companies there are hundreds of custom knife makers and bladesmiths producing Bowies and variations. The Bowie knife dominates the work produced by members of the American Bladesmith Society.  Collecting antique Bowie knives is one of the higher-end forms of knife collecting with rare models selling as high as $200,000. Even mass-produced Sheffield Bowies from the 19th century can sell in the range of $5,000US to $15,000US.

Portrayal in popular culture
The Bowie knife has been present in popular culture throughout the ages, ranging from the days of the Western dime novels and pulps to Literary Fiction such as the 1897 classic vampire novel Dracula by Irish author Bram Stoker. Despite the popular image of Count Dracula having a stake driven through his heart at the conclusion of the story, Dracula is actually killed by his heart being pierced by Quincey Morris's Bowie knife and his throat being sliced by Jonathan Harker's kukri knife. Bowie knives appeared in the classic works of Americans Harriet Beecher Stowe and Mark Twain, Englishman Charles Dickens, and Frenchman Jules Verne.

The Bowie knife was a staple in The Alamo movies of 1960 and 2004; the first three Rambo movies, First Blood (1982), Rambo: First Blood Part II (1985), and Rambo III (1988); the film Crocodile Dundee (1986) and its sequel Crocodile Dundee II (1988); and Friday the 13th (1980). The Bowie knife is also Ghostface's signature weapon in the Scream franchise (1996). 

The famous singer and musician David Bowie (born David Robert Jones) took the name Bowie after the Bowie knife because, in his words, "it cuts both ways".

In the first-person shooter video game Team Fortress 2, the Sniper character has an unlockable weapon named the Bushwacka, which is styled after a Bowie knife.

Historical and Modern Legal status

Because of its widespread use and deadly effect when used in hand-to-hand fighting, it has been argued by some historians that the Bowie knife was seen by upper-class Americans as the 19th-century equivalent of today's mass-produced handgun or 'Saturday night special', particularly in the states of the Old Southwest.  In 1837, just one year after Bowie's death at the Alamo, Alabama legislators passed laws imposing a $100 transfer tax on 'Bowie' knives and decreeing that anyone carrying a Bowie knife who subsequently killed a person in a fight would be charged with premeditated murder. Louisiana and Virginia prohibited the concealed carrying of any Bowie knife, while Mississippi made such knives illegal when carried concealed or when used as a dueling weapon. In Tennessee, the use of Bowie knives to settle disputes on the spot so alarmed the wealthy classes composing the state legislature that in 1838 they not only made the concealed carrying of a Bowie knife a criminal felony, but also prohibited the use of a Bowie knife in any altercation, regardless of self-defense or other mitigating excuse:

That if any person carrying any knife or weapon known as a Bowie knife ... or any knife or weapon that shall in form, shape, or size resemble a Bowie knife, on a sudden encounter, shall cut or stab another person with such knife or weapon, whether death ensues or not, such person so stabbing or cutting shall be guilty of a felony, and upon conviction thereof shall be confined in the jail and penitentiary house of this State, for a period of time not less than three years, nor more than fifteen years.Cramer, pp. 111–112: So great was public pressure to clamp down on use of the Bowie knife that the Tennessee Supreme Court upheld the law two years later (Aymette v. State, 2 Hump. (21 Tenn.) 154 (1840)), even though it had to pointedly ignore its own prior 1833 decision on the state constitutional right to bear arms in order to do so (Simpson v. State, 5 Yerg. 356, Tenn. 1833: "By this clause of the constitution, an express power is given and secured to all the free citizens of the state to keep and bear arms for their defence, without any qualification whatever as to their kind or nature."  Even Texas passed legislation in 1871 prohibiting the carrying of a Bowie knife "on or about one's person" in public places, a law which remained in place until 2017.

Although many jurisdictions worldwide have knife legislation regulating the length of a blade one may own or carry, certain locales in the United States have legislation restricting or prohibiting the carrying of a "Bowie knife". Most of these laws were characterized at the time as 'anti-dueling' laws.  However, it is important to note that in this context, the term dueling had degenerated from its original 18th century definition (a rarely used social custom among the wealthy classes) into a generalized description for any knife or gun fight between two contestants. In some states, many of these laws are still in force today whereas, in other states, these laws were repealed or amended.

In 2017, the old Texas law prohibiting the carrying of a Bowie knife in public was finally updated to allow such carry in most circumstances, with exceptions for knives of a certain blade length which cannot be carried in schools, polling places, places of worship, amusement parks, courthouses, racetracks, correctional facilities, hospitals and nursing facilities, sporting events, and certain establishments selling alcohol. The Texas Legislature designated the Bowie knife as the official state knife of Texas in 2021.

It is argued that the terms "Bowie Knife" and "Arkansas Toothpick" are too subjective to form the basis of sound legislation.

See also
 Arkansas toothpick

Notes

Informational notes

Citations

Further reading
 Cramer, Clayton E. Concealed Weapon Laws of the Early Republic: Dueling, Southern Violence, and Moral Reform. Praeger Publishers, 1999.

External links
 

American frontier
Blade weapons
Knives
Weapons of the Confederate States of America
Fur trade
Piracy